Garmeshak or Garmeshk may refer to:
 Garmeshak, Hormozgan
 Garmeshk, Kerman